Mary Joe Fernández and Natasha Zvereva were the defending champions but did not compete that year.

Arantxa Sánchez Vicario and Irina Spîrlea won in the final 6–4, 3–6, 6–3 against Gigi Fernández and Martina Hingis.

Seeds
Champion seeds are indicated in bold text while text in italics indicates the round in which those seeds were eliminated. The top four seeded teams received byes into the second round.

Draw

Finals

Top half

Bottom half

External links
 Official results archive (ITF)
 Official results archive (WTA)

Women's Doubles
Doubles